Antonio Molinari, also known as il Caraccino, (21 January 1655 – 3 February 1704) was an Italian painter of the Baroque era in Venice.

Biography
The son of a painter, Molinari was apprenticed to Antonio Zanchi in Venice. He was strongly influenced by the vigorous and athletic paintings of Neapolitan painters such as Luca Giordano. He typically painted tumultuous narratives of mythology and religion in large canvases. This would influence his pupil (1697–1703), Giovanni Battista Piazzetta, and his grand manner style.

Works

His works include:

Feeding of the Five Thousand (1690; San Pantalon, Venice)
Darius and His Family Before Alexander (1690)
Judith with the Head of Holofernes (1690)
Death of Uzzah (c. 1695; Santa Maria degli Angeli in Murano)
Fight of Centaurs and Lapiths (c. 1698, Ca' Rezzonico).
The Boy Moses Stepping on Pharaoh's Crown (c. 1690s–1704), Museum Kunstpalast
Adoration of the Golden Calf (1700–1702), The Hermitage Museum, Saint Petersburg
Adam and Eve (1701–1704), David Owsley Museum of Art
David and Abigail

Gallery

Sources

 Grove encyclopedia biography on Artnet.

1655 births
1704 deaths
17th-century Italian painters
Italian male painters
18th-century Italian painters
Painters from Venice
Italian Baroque painters
18th-century Italian male artists